Maksim Aleksandrovich Mayrovich (born 6 February 1996) is a Russian football player. He plays for Armenian club Urartu.

Club career
He made his debut for the main squad of FC Kuban Krasnodar on 28 February 2016 in a Russian Cup quarterfinal game against FC Zenit Saint Petersburg.

He made his Russian Premier League debut for Kuban on 5 March 2016 in a game against FC Rubin Kazan.

On 5 September 2021, Mayrovich returned to Noah. Mayrovich left Noah on 4 June 2022 after his contract expired.

International
He won the 2013 UEFA European Under-17 Championship with the Russia national under-17 football team, scoring one goal in the group stage. He also participated in the 2013 FIFA U-17 World Cup with that squad.

Personal life
He has a sister, Maria Mayrovich, who was a student-athlete at the University of Kansas.

Career statistics

Club

Honours and achievements

Club
FC Noah
 Armenian Cup (1): 2019–20

References

External links
 
 

1996 births
Sportspeople from Irkutsk
Living people
Russian footballers
Russia youth international footballers
Russia under-21 international footballers
Association football forwards
FC Kuban Krasnodar players
FC KAMAZ Naberezhnye Chelny players
FC Chertanovo Moscow players
FC Noah players
FC Akron Tolyatti players
FC Urartu players
Russian Premier League players
Russian First League players
Russian Second League players
Armenian Premier League players
Russian expatriate footballers
Expatriate footballers in Armenia
Russian expatriate sportspeople in Armenia